SDP may refer to:

Computing
 Scenario Design Power, a power level mode of certain generations of Intel's mobile processors
 Semidefinite programming, an optimization procedure
 Service data point, a node in mobile telecommunication networks
 Service delivery platform, a mobile telecommunications component 
 Service Design Package, the repository of all design information for a service in ITIL
 Service discovery protocol, a type of service discovery for network services
 Session Description Protocol, a communication protocol for describing multimedia sessions
 Single-dealer platform, software used in financial trading
 Sockets Direct Protocol, a low-level remote-computing protocol
 Software Defined Perimeter, also called "Black Cloud", an approach to computer security

Music
 Stephen Dale Petit (born 1969), an American blues musician
 Scha Dara Parr, a Japanese hip-hop group
 Stuart Price (born 1977), a British music producer who occasionally remixes under the moniker SDP
 SDP (band), a German pop/hip-hop duo

Political parties
 Social Democratic Party, a list of parties with this name 
 Socialist Democratic Party (disambiguation)

Europe
 Social Democratic Party (Andorra)
 Social Democratic Party of Bosnia and Herzegovina
 Social Democratic Party of Croatia
 Social Democratic Party of Finland
 Social Democratic Party of Germany
 Social Democratic Party in the GDR
 Sudeten German Party (Sudetendeutsche Partei)
 Social Democratic Party (Latvia)
 Social Democratic Party of Montenegro
 Social Democratic Party (Serbia 2001–10)
 Social Democratic Party (Serbia 2014-)
 Social Democratic Party of Serbia
 Social Democratic Party (UK)
 Social Democratic Party (UK, 1988)
 Social Democratic Party (UK, 1990–present)
 Socialist Democratic Party (Turkey)

Elsewhere
 Social Democratic Party of America
 Socialist Democratic Party (Canada)
 Socialist Democratic Party (Chile)
 Social Democratic Party (Japan)
 Socialist Democratic Party (Japan)
 Social Democratic Party (New Zealand)
 Socialist Democrat Party (Peru)
 Singapore Democratic Party
Communist Party of Kenya, formerly known as the Social Democratic Party of Kenya

Transport
 SDP, the IATA code for Sand Point Airport in the Aleutian Islands, Alaska, US
 SDP, the National Rail code for Sandplace railway station, Cornwall, UK
 Stoomtrein Dendermonde-Puurs, the Dendermonde–Puurs Steam Railway heritage railway in Belgium

Other uses
 San Diego Padres, American professional baseball team
 School District of Philadelphia
 sdp, the ISO 639-3 code for the Sherdukpen language spoken in Arunachal Pradesh, India 
 Society of Decorative Painters
 Stardust Pictures, a film studio, operating as a subsidiary of Stardust Promotion
 State Domestic Product, in economics
Substantive due process, legal principal in the United States

See also
 SPD (disambiguation)
 DSP (disambiguation)
 PDS (disambiguation)
 Democratic Socialist Party (disambiguation)
 Party of Democratic Socialism (disambiguation)